Eilis Flynn (b. Elizabeth Myrtle Smith, on May 12 in Tacoma, Washington, United States), is an American author of four fantasy romance novels for the publisher, Cerridwen Press. She also has written for DC Comics using the name Elizabeth M. Smith.

Personal life

Early years
Elizabeth Myrtle Smith was born on a May 12 in Tacoma, WA, the youngest of four children. She is of Japanese descent. Her parents met during the occupation of Japan following World War II, and her older siblings were all born in Japan. Soon after her birth, her family relocated again to Japan, making Japanese her first language. She sold her first fiction at 18 to DC Comics, writing Superman stories. After receiving her degree in linguistic anthropology from the University of Washington, she attended Columbia University in New York for one year, where she married her first and still current husband. Professionally a financial editor, Flynn describes her fantasy romances as being "no less based in reality."

Flynn returned with her husband to the Seattle area in 1989, and soon began writing romance fiction. She is a past president of the Greater Seattle Romance Writers of America. Her first book, The Sleeper Awakes, was published in 2007.

Nonfiction
 Ghosts Along the Silk Road
 Dragons Along the Silk Road
 Vampires and Zombies Along the Silk Road
 Water Beasties Across the Seven Seas
 She Nodded Her Head Up and Down (as Elizabeth M.S. Flynn)

Fiction
The Sleeper Awakes
Festival of Stars
Introducing Sonika
Echoes of Passion (rereleased as Echoes of Neotia Prime)
Riddle of Ryu
Static Shock
Dreaming Beauty
His 30-Day Guarantee
Wear Black (with Heather Hiestand)

External links

 Official website
 Official blog

21st-century American novelists
American women novelists
American romantic fiction writers
Writers from Seattle
Writers from Tacoma, Washington
Living people
American writers of Japanese descent
American fantasy writers
Year of birth missing (living people)
University of Washington College of Arts and Sciences alumni
American novelists of Asian descent
Women science fiction and fantasy writers
Women romantic fiction writers
21st-century American women writers
Novelists from Washington (state)
Columbia University alumni